Young at Heart/Wise in Time is an album by pianist/composer Muhal Richard Abrams released by the Delmark label in 1970 that featured an LP side-length solo piano composition and Abrams accompanied by Leo Smith, Henry Threadgill, Lester Lashley and Thurman Barker on the other side.

Reception

The Allmusic review by Scott Yanow calls the album "Fascinating music, it is recommended strictly for the open-eared listener who does not demand that all jazz swing conventionally".  The Penguin Guide to Jazz awarded the album 3½ stars stating "Young/Wise combines the definitive Abrams solo performance of the period with a group of tracks of burning intensity". The Rolling Stone Jazz Record Guide said it has "a long example of Abram's reflective piano and a tighter group performance by an excellent AACM quintet".

Track listing
All compositions by Muhal Richard Abrams
 "Young at Heart" - 29:20  
 "Wise in Time" - 21:52

Personnel
Muhal Richard Abrams: piano
Henry Threadgill: alto saxophone (track 2)
Leo Smith: trumpet, flugelhorn (track 2)
Lester Lashley: bass (track 2)
Thurman Barker: drums (track 2)

References

1970 albums
Muhal Richard Abrams albums
Delmark Records albums
Albums produced by Bob Koester